Enochrus ochraceus is a species of water scavenger beetle in the family Hydrophilidae. It is found in the Caribbean Sea, Central America, and North America.

References

Further reading

External links

 

Hydrophilinae
Articles created by Qbugbot
Beetles described in 1844